Pajović is a Serbian surname, a patronymic derived from the given name Paja.

Darko Pajović (born 1972), Montenegrin politician
Filip Pajović (born 1993), Serbian footballer 
Lazar Pajović, Serbian footballer
Tomislav Pajović, Serbian footballer
Helena Pajović (1979–2000), Serbian figure skater

See also
Aleš Pajovič (born 1979), Slovenian handball player

Serbian surnames